Léa Parment (born 16 December 1996) is a French ice hockey player for Évry-Viry HC and the French national team.

She represented France at the 2019 IIHF Women's World Championship.

References

External links

1996 births
Living people
French expatriate ice hockey people
French expatriate sportspeople in Sweden
French women's ice hockey forwards
Sportspeople from Villeneuve-Saint-Georges